Tyromyces is a genus of poroid fungi in the family Polyporaceae. It was circumscribed by mycologist Petter Karsten in 1881. The type species is the widely distributed Tyromyces chioneus, commonly known as the white cheese polypore. The phylogenetic position of Tyromyces within the Polyporales is uncertain, but it appears that it does not belong to the "core polyporoid clade". Tyromyces is polyphyletic as it is currently circumscribed, and has been described as "a dumping place for monomitic white-rot species with thin-walled spores."

Description
Tyromyces fungi have fruit bodies that are pileate (i.e., with a cap) to resupinate (crust-like). Fruit bodies are short-lived, and often mostly white, but turning a darker colour when dry. The colour of the pore surface is usually white to cream, sometime with greenish tinges. Like the cap surface, it darkens when dry.

Microscopic characteristics
The hyphal system is either monomitic (meaning the fungus contains only generative hyphae, which in this case have clamps) or dimitic, containing both generative and skeletal hyphae. The spores are smooth, thin-walled, and hyaline (translucent). They are allantoid (long with rounded ends) to ovoid (egg-shaped), and are non-reactive with Melzer's reagent. There are no cystidia in the hymenium, although there may be cystidioles (sterile cells of about the same diameter and shape as an immature basidium that protrude beyond the surface of the hymenium).

Tyromyces are white rot fungi with a cosmopolitan distribution.

Species
, Index Fungorum accepts 119 species of Tyromyces.
Tyromyces albiformis Quanten (1997) – Papua New Guinea
Tyromyces albogilvus (Berk. & M.A.Curtis) Murrill (1907)
Tyromyces albovinaceus Corner (1989)
Tyromyces albus Ryvarden (2013)
Tyromyces allantoideus M.P.Christ. (1960) – Europe
Tyromyces amarus (Hedgc.) J.Lowe (1975)
Tyromyces apalus Bondartsev (1953)
Tyromyces aquosus (Henn.) Ryvarden (2014) – Brazil
Tyromyces armeniacus J.D.Zhao & X.Q.Zhang (1983) – China
Tyromyces atroalbus (Rick) Rajchenb. (1987)
Tyromyces atrostrigosus (Cooke) G.Cunn. (1965)
Tyromyces aurantiacus (Komarova) Komarova (1964)
Tyromyces avellaneialbus Murrill (1938)
Tyromyces bibulus (Pers.) Bondartsev & Singer (1941)
Tyromyces carbonicola Corner (1992)
Tyromyces carpatorossicus  (Pilát ex Pilát) Bondartsev (1953)
Tyromyces catervatus  (Berk.) G.Cunn. (1965)
Tyromyces chioneus  (Fr.) P.Karst. (1881)
Tyromyces cinereobrunneus Bitew & Ryvarden (2004) – Ethiopia
Tyromyces cinnamomeiporus Corner (1989)
Tyromyces cinnamomeus M.Mata & Ryvarden (2010) – Costa Rica
Tyromyces citriniporus Corner (1992)
Tyromyces corniculatus Corner (1989)
Tyromyces corticicola Corner (1989)
Tyromyces crassisporus Log.-Leite & J.E.Wright (1991)
Tyromyces crispellus (Peck) Murrill (1907)
Tyromyces dacrydii  Corner (1989)
Tyromyces descendens Corner (1989)
Tyromyces dianthicolor Corner (1989)
Tyromyces duplexus M.Mata & Ryvarden (2010) – Costa Rica
Tyromyces duracinus (Pat.) Murrill (1907) – South America
Tyromyces eberhardtii (Pat.) Ryvarden (1983)
Tyromyces ethiopicus Bitew & Ryvarden (2004) – Ethiopia
Tyromyces exiguus (Colenso) G.Cunn. (1965)
Tyromyces falcatus G.Cunn. (1965)
Tyromyces favulus Corner (1989)
Tyromyces formosanus T.T.Chang & W.N.Chou (1999)
Tyromyces fumidiceps  G.F.Atk. (1908) – North America
Tyromyces galactinus (Berk.) J.Lowe (1975) – Portugal

Tyromyces gilvellus  (Pilát) Komarova (1964)
Tyromyces globosporus  Ipulet & Ryvarden (2005) – Africa
Tyromyces gollanii  (Massee) S.Ahmad (1972)
Tyromyces hispidulinanus Corner (1989)
Tyromyces humeana (Murrill) J.Lowe (1975)
Tyromyces hyalinus (Berk.) Ryvarden (1980)
Tyromyces hypocitrinus (Berk.) Ryvarden (1984)
Tyromyces illudens (Overh. & J.Lowe) J.Lowe (1975) – New South Wales
Tyromyces imbricatus  J.D.Zhao & X.Q.Zhang (1983)
Tyromyces incarnatus Imazeki (1954)
Tyromyces inodermatus Corner (1989)
Tyromyces interponens Corner (1989)
Tyromyces irpiceus Corner (1989)
Tyromyces kmetii (Bres.) Bondartsev & Singer (1941)

Tyromyces lacteus (Fr.) Murrill (1907) – Great Britain
Tyromyces languidus Corner (1989)
Tyromyces leucomallus (Berk. & M.A.Curtis) Murrill (1907)
Tyromyces leucospongia (Cooke & Harkn.) Bondartsev & Singer (1941) – United States

Tyromyces levis Corner (1989)
Tyromyces limitatus Ryvarden (2000)
Tyromyces lineatus  (Overh.) J.Lowe (1975)
Tyromyces magnisporus Murrill (1940)
Tyromyces marianii (Bres.) Ryvarden (1988)
Tyromyces mediocris Corner (1989)
Tyromyces merrittii Murrill (1908)
Tyromyces mexicanus Ryvarden & Guzmán (2001) – Mexico
Tyromyces mollicaseus Corner (1989)
Tyromyces navarroi  M.Mata & Ryvarden (2010) – Costa Rica
Tyromyces nemorosus Corner (1989)
Tyromyces neostrigosus Ryvarden & Iturr. (2003)
Tyromyces nodulosus Ryvarden (2000)
Tyromyces ochraceicarneus Corner (1992)
Tyromyces ochraceivinosus Corner (1989)
Tyromyces olivascens (Corner) T.Hatt. (2003)
Tyromyces oxyporoides Ryvarden & Iturr. (2011)
Tyromyces pendens Ipulet & Ryvarden (2005)
Tyromyces perskeletalis Corner (1989)
Tyromyces pinguis Corner (1992)
Tyromyces polyetes  Parmasto (1959)
Tyromyces polyporoides Ryvarden & Iturr. (2003)
Tyromyces praeguttulatus  (Murrill) Ryvarden (1985)
Tyromyces pseudoalbidus Bondartseva (1970)
Tyromyces pseudohoehnelii Bondartsev & Komarova (1959)
Tyromyces pulcherrimus (Rodway) G.Cunn. (1965) – Australia

Tyromyces pulviniformis Corner (1989)
Tyromyces pusillicaesius  Corner (1989)
Tyromyces pusillus  (Fr.) G.Cunn. (1965)
Tyromyces raduloides (Henn.) Ryvarden (1980)
Tyromyces reticulatomarginatus (Pilát) Bondartsev & Singer (1941)
Tyromyces rhodomelon Corner (1989)
Tyromyces rubrifuscescens Corner (1989)
Tyromyces rufipendens Corner (1989)
Tyromyces rufipileatus Corner (1989)
Tyromyces sambuceus (Lloyd) Imazeki (1943)
Tyromyces satakei  (Imazeki) Quanten (1997)
Tyromyces semilimitatus Ryvarden & Iturr. (2011)
Tyromyces setiger (Cooke) Teng (1963)
Tyromyces sinapicolor Corner (1992)
Tyromyces singeri Ryvarden (1987)
Tyromyces squamosellus  Núñez & Ryvarden (1999)
Tyromyces squamulosus (Bres.) Ryvarden (1988) – Japan
Tyromyces stenomitis  Corner (1989)
Tyromyces subacutus (Murrill) Ryvarden (1985)
Tyromyces sublacteus M.P.Christ. (1960) – Europe
Tyromyces subradiatus Corner (1989)
Tyromyces subroseiporus  Corner (1989)
Tyromyces subrubescens Corner (1989)
Tyromyces subviridis Ryvarden & Guzmán (2001) – Mexico
Tyromyces sulfureiceps Corner (1989)
Tyromyces tephronotus (Berk.) G.Cunn. (1965) – Tasmania
Tyromyces tephrus  (Pat.) Ryvarden (1983)
Tyromyces tibeticus  J.D.Zhao & X.Q.Zhang (1983)
Tyromyces toatoa G.Cunn. (1965) – New Zealand
Tyromyces tristaniae  Corner (1989)
Tyromyces viride Ryvarden & Guzmán (2001) – Mexico
Tyromyces vitellinus Ryvarden & Hauskn. (2006)
Tyromyces vivii Homble ex Ryvarden (2003)
Tyromyces xuchilensis (Murrill) Ryvarden (1985) – Bolivia, China
Tyromyces zameriensis (Pilát) Bondartsev (1953)

References

 
Polyporales genera
Taxa named by Petter Adolf Karsten
Taxa described in 1881